Brian Viloria (born November 24, 1980) is a retired American professional boxer of Filipino descent. He is a former unified WBA and WBO flyweight champion, as well as a former WBC and IBF light flyweight champion. His nickname of "The Hawaiian Punch" was first given to him by Jesus Salud, a fellow Hawaiian  of Filipino descent and himself a former world champion in boxing.

Amateur career
In 1999, he won the US championships, the national Golden Gloves and the world title as an amateur at the 1999 World Amateur Boxing Championships in Houston, Texas but lost early at the Sydney Olympics 2000 against Brahim Asloum, who he had beaten in the 1999 World Championships in Houston, Texas. His overall record was 230-8.

He went to Northern Michigan University as part of the United States Olympic Education Center. Viloria bested both Glenn Donaire in the quarter-finals, and future world champion Nonito Donaire in the semi-finals of the 2000 US Olympic Trials. He won a spot on the 2000 Olympic team by defeating his one-time teammate, Karoz Norman.

Viloria went to the Sydney Olympics as a medal favorite, but lost to eventual gold medalist Brahim Asloum of France, 6-4. Viloria landed dozens of body punches but the judges did not award points for his blows.

Amateur Highlights
1995 National Junior Olympics Gold Medalist at 100 lbs.
1996 National Junior Olympics Gold Medalist at 106 lbs.
1996 World Junior Olympics Gold Medalist at 106 lbs.
1997 National Junior Olympics Bronze Medalist at 112 lbs.
1998 National Amateur Championships Bronze Medalist at 106 lbs.
1999 National Amateur Championships Gold Medalist at 106 lbs.
1999 National Golden Gloves Light Flyweight Gold Medalist
1999 World Amateur Championships Gold Medalist
1999 USA Boxer of The Year
Member of the 2000 US Olympic Team. His results were:
Defeated Sergey Kazakov (Russia) 8-6
Lost to Brahim Asloum (France) 4-6

Professional career

Flyweight
Viloria started his professional career as a flyweight and picked up 17 wins with no defeats. He also captured and defended the NABF Flyweight title in the process before moving down to the Light Flyweight division.

Light Flyweight
On September 10, 2005, Viloria dropped down to light flyweight and won the WBC crown by knocking out Eric Ortiz in the first round with a powerful right.

He successfully defended it once on February 18, 2006, against José Antonio Aguirre (boxer) and was undefeated in 20 bouts. Viloria's unbeaten streak ended when he was dethroned by Mexican Omar Niño Romero on August 10, 2006.

In a rematch held on November 18, 2006, at Las Vegas, Romero held on to his title with a controversial majority draw decision, with Viloria knocking down Romero twice during the fight. Romero was then stripped of his title after failing a post fight drug test for methamphetamine and the decision was overturned into a no-contest.

On April 14, 2007, he fought Edgar Sosa for the vacant WBC Light Flyweight title but lost via majority decision.

Super Flyweight
Viloria then decided to move up to the super flyweight division and began training under former champion, Robert Garcia, at La Colonia Gym in Oxnard, California.

Brian Viloria won via unanimous decision against Jose Garcia Bernal (26-11-1) in his debut at the super flyweight division at the Alameda Swap Meet in Los Angeles, California on January 5, 2008. Viloria secured four more victories before deciding to move back down to Light Flyweight.

Return to Light Flyweight
On April 19, 2009, Viloria moved back down to junior flyweight to challenge Mexican Ulises "Archie" Solís for the IBF Junior Flyweight title. Pressured by a fading career due to his past losses in big fights, Viloria defeated Solis, whom at the time of the fight was rated the #1 Jr. Flyweight by The Ring in the 11th round with a vicious right to the jaw. The official bout stoppage was a KO 2:56 into the 11th round. The fight was held at Araneta Coliseum in the Philippines, site of the Thrilla in Manila, as the co-main event of the Donaire-Martinez fight. Viloria snapped Solis' 11-fight unbeaten streak, 8 of which were title defenses while extending his win streak to 6.

Viloria successfully defended his IBF Junior Flyweight title on August 29, 2009, against Jesus Iribe.

For his second defense, Viloria fought Carlos Tamara of Colombia on January 23, 2010. Though leading in points, the referee called a halt to the bout in Tamara's favor as Viloria was close to passing out in the twelfth round awarding Tamara a TKO victory and the belt. Moments following the bout, Viloria passed out due to extreme exhaustion.

Return to Flyweight
Viloria returned to the flyweight division against Mexico's Omar Soto on July 10, 2010, at the Yñares Sports Arena, Pasig, Metro Manila.

On July 16, 2011, Viloria captured the WBO Flyweight title by besting Mexican Julio César Miranda. On December 10, 2011, Viloria stopped Giovani Segura by way of an 8th Round TKO. On May 13, 2012, Viloria stopped his rival Omar Niño Romero in the 9th round for another successful defense of his WBO Flyweight title.

On November 17, 2012, Viloria challenged Hernan Marquez in a flyweight unification between his WBO title and the Marquez's WBA crown. He went on to stop Marquez in 10 rounds becoming the first flyweight unified world champion since 1965. Viloria then lost both titles to Juan Francisco Estrada on April 6, 2013.

Viloria picked up four more wins before facing pound for pound king Román González on October 17, 2015, for the WBC and The Ring Flyweight titles. Viloria was stopped in the 9th round and lost via TKO. At the time of the stoppage, the scorecards were 78-73, 78-73 and 79-72 in favor of Gonzalez.

Viloria, ranked #2 by the WBA, later fought Artem Dalakian, who was ranked #1 by the WBA, on February 24, 2018, for the WBA flyweight title but lost by unanimous decision. He subsequently retired after the fight.

Professional boxing record

{|class="wikitable" style="text-align:center"
|-
!No.
!Result
!Record
!Opponent
!Type
!Round, time
!Date
!Location
!Notes
|-
|46
|Loss
|38–6 
|align=left| Artem Dalakian
|UD
|12
|Feb 24, 2018
|align=left|
|align=left|
|- align=center
|45
|Win
|38–5 
|align=left| Miguel Cartagena
|KO
|5 (10)
|Sep 9, 2017
|align=left|
|align=left|
|- align=center
|44
|Win
|37–5 
|align=left| Ruben Montoya
|UD
|10
|Mar 2, 2017
|align=left|
|align=left|
|- align=center
|43
|Loss
|36–5 
|align=left| Román González
|TKO
|9 (12), 
|Oct 17, 2015
|align=left|
|align=left|
|- align=center
|42
|Win
|36–4 
|align=left| Omar Soto
|KO
|1 (8), 
|Jul 25, 2015
|align=left|
|align=left|
|- align=center
|41
|Win
|35–4 
|align=left| Armando Vazquez
|KO
|4 (10), 
|Dec 6, 2014
|align=left|
|align=left|
|- align=center
|40
|Win
|34–4 
|align=left| José Alfredo Zúñiga
|KO
|5 (10), 
|Jul 19, 2014
|align=left|
|align=left|
|- align=center
|39
|Win
|33–4 
|align=left| Juan Herrera
|UD
|10
|Mar 29, 2014
|align=left|
|align=left|
|- align=center
|38
|Loss 
|32–4 
|align=left| Juan Francisco Estrada
|SD
|12
|Apr 6, 2013
|align=left|
|align=left|
|- align=center
|37
|Win 
|32–3 
|align=left| Hernán Márquez
|TKO
|10 (12), 
|Nov 17, 2012
|align=left|
|align=left|
|- align=center
|36
|Win 
|31–3 
|align=left| Omar Niño Romero
|TKO
|9 (12),  
|May 13, 2012
|align=left| 
|align=left|
|- align=center
|35
|Win 
|30–3 
|align=left| Giovani Segura
|TKO
|8 (12),  
|Dec 10, 2011
|align=left| 
|align=left|
|- align=center
|34
|Win 
|29–3 
|align=left| Julio César Miranda
|UD
|12
|Jul 16, 2011
|align=left| 
|align=left|
|- align=center
|33
|Win 
|28–3 
|align=left| Liempetch Sor Veerapol	
|TKO
|7 (10),  
|Nov 5, 2010
|align=left| 
|align=left|
|- align=center
|32
|Win 
|27–3 
|align=left| Omar Soto	
|SD
|10
|Jul 10, 2010
|align=left| 
|align=left|
|- align=center
|31
|Loss
|26–3 
|align=left| Carlos Tamara
|TKO
|12 (12),  
|Jan 23, 2010
|align=left| 
|align=left|
|- align=center
|30
|Win 
|26–2 
|align=left| Jesus Iribe
|UD
|12
|Aug 29, 2009
|align=left| 
|align=left|
|- align=center
|29
|Win 
|25–2 
|align=left| Ulises Solís
|KO
|11 (12),  
|Apr 19, 2009
|align=left| 
|align=left|
|- align=center
|28
|Win 
|24–2 
|align=left| Benjamin Garcia
|KO
|2 (10), 
|Dec 12, 2008
|align=left| 
|align=left|
|- align=center
|27
|Win 
|23–2 
|align=left| Juan Javier Lagos
|UD
|8
|Sep 25, 2008
|align=left| 
|align=left|
|- align=center
|26
|Win 
|22–2 
|align=left| Fred Heberto Valdez
|KO
|3 (10),  
|May 17, 2008
|align=left| 
|align=left|
|- align=center
|25
|Win 
|21–2 
|align=left| Cesar Lopez
|UD
|8
|Feb 16, 2008
|align=left| 
|align=left|
|- align=center
|24
|Win 
|20–2 
|align=left| Jose Garcia Bernal
|UD
|8
|Jan 4, 2008
|align=left| 
|align=left|
|- align=center
|23
|Loss 
|19–2 
|align=left| Édgar Sosa
|MD
|12
|Apr 14, 2007
|align=left| 
|align=left|
|- align=center
|22
|style="background:#ddd;"|NC
|19–1 
|align=left| Omar Niño Romero
|ND
|12
|Nov 18, 2006
|align=left| 
|align=left|
|- align=center
|21
|Loss 
|19–1 
|align=left| Omar Niño Romero
|UD
|12
|Aug 10, 2006
|align=left| 
|align=left|
|- align=center
|20
|Win
|19–0 
|align=left| José Antonio Aguirre
|UD
|12
|Feb 18, 2006
|align=left| 
|align=left|
|- align=center
|19
|Win
|18–0 
|align=left| Eric Ortiz
|KO
|1 (12),  
|Sep 10, 2005
|align=left| 
|align=left|
|- align=center
|18
|Win
|17–0 
|align=left| Ruben Contreras
|TKO
|6 (8),  
|May 28, 2005
|align=left| 
|align=left|
|- align=center
|17
|Win
|16–0 
|align=left| Angel Antonio Priolo
|KO
|7 (12),  
|Dec 16, 2004
|align=left| 
|align=left|
|- align=center
|16
|Win
|15–0 
|align=left| Gilberto Keb Baas
|KO
|11 (12),  
|Jun 4, 2004
|align=left| 
|align=left|
|- align=center
|15
|Win
|14–0 
|align=left| Juan Alfonso Keb Baas
|UD
|12
|Feb 13, 2004
|align=left| 
|align=left|
|- align=center
|14
|Win
|13–0 
|align=left| Luis Doria
|TKO
|1 (10),  
|Jul 22, 2003
|align=left| 
|align=left|
|- align=center
|13
|Win
|12–0 
|align=left| Valentin Leon
|TKO
|8 (10)
|Apr 15, 2003
|align=left| 
|align=left|
|- align=center
|12
|Win
|11–0 
|align=left| Alejandro Moreno
|UD
|12
|Jan 10, 2003
|align=left| 
|align=left|
|- align=center
|11
|Win
|10–0 
|align=left| Alberto Rossel
|MD
|12
|Nov 24, 2002
|align=left| 
|align=left|
|- align=center
|10
|Win
|9–0 
|align=left| Juan Javier Lagos
|UD
|12
|Aug 30, 2002
|align=left| 
|align=left|
|- align=center
|9
|style="background:#DDD"|
|8–0 
|align=left| Alberto Rossel
|UD
|12
|Jul 26, 2002
|align=left| 
|align=left|
|- align=center
|8
|Win
|8–0
|align=left| Francisco Soto
|TKO
|5 (10),  
|Jun 18, 2002
|align=left| 
|align=left|
|- align=center
|7
|Win
|7–0
|align=left| Sandro Orlando Oviedo
|KO
|1 (8),  
|May 17, 2002
|align=left| 
|align=left|
|- align=center
|6
|Win
|6–0
|align=left| Leonardo Gutierrez
|TKO
|4 (6)
|Mar 15, 2002
|align=left| 
|align=left|
|- align=center
|5
|Win
|5–0
|align=left| Antonio Perez
|TKO
|3 (6),  
|Jan 5, 2002
|align=left| 
|align=left|
|- align=center
|4
|Win
|4–0
|align=left| Mike Thomas
|UD
|4
|Nov 23, 2001
|align=left| 
|align=left|
|- align=center
|3
|Win
|3–0
|align=left| Sheldon Wile
|TKO
|1 (4)
|Nov 9, 2001
|align=left| 
|align=left|
|- align=center
|2
|Win
|2–0
|align=left| Kenny Berrios
|TKO
|4 (4),  
|Sep 28, 2001
|align=left| 
|align=left|
|- align=center
|1
|Win
|1–0
|align=left| Benjamin Escobia
|UD
|4
|May 15, 2001
|align=left| 
|align=left|
|- align=center

Titles in boxing 
Major World Titles:
WBO Flyweight Champion (112 lbs)
WBA (Super) Flyweight title. (112 lbs)
IBF Light Flyweight title. (108 lbs)
WBC Light Flyweight title. (108 lbs)
Minor World Titles:
NABF Flyweight title. (112 lbs)
WBC Youth Flyweight title. (112 lbs)

Outside the ring
On September 6, 2009, Viloria, who was in attendance at the World Cup of Pool, was chosen to perform the ceremonial break shot before the start of the final match. Because he never played pocket billiards before, Viloria miscued on his first attempt but achieved the shot on his second.

See also
List of light-flyweight boxing champions
List of flyweight boxing champions
List of Filipino boxing world champions

References

External links

2000 Olympics team info
Profile
Brian Viloria - Profile, News Archive & Current Rankings at Box.Live

|-

|-

|-

1980 births
Living people
Olympic boxers of the United States
Boxers at the 2000 Summer Olympics
Ilocano people
American sportspeople of Filipino descent
Boxers from Hawaii
American male boxers
Filipino male boxers
Light-flyweight boxers
Flyweight boxers
World light-flyweight boxing champions
World flyweight boxing champions
World Boxing Council champions
International Boxing Federation champions
World Boxing Organization champions
World Boxing Association champions
Winners of the United States Championship for amateur boxers
AIBA World Boxing Championships medalists
American people of Ilocano descent